Dresano is a comune (municipality) in the Metropolitan City of Milan in the Italian region Lombardy, located about  southeast of Milan.

Dresano borders the following municipalities: Mediglia, Tribiano, Mulazzano, Colturano, Vizzolo Predabissi and Casalmaiocco.

Etymology 

The name Dresano is due to the presence, in these swampy areas, of three inlets, three "sinuses", from which the name evolved over the centuries: Tresseno, then Tressano and Tresano, and finally Dresano.  The three inlets appear in the coat of arms too, surmounted by three poplar trees, the poplar being one of the most typical local trees.

History 

.

The old village hosts the remains of one of its most ancient buildings: on the East side of Piazza Manzoni the wall of an establishment with a massive wooden double door is found, which was part of the convent of the benedictines, who performed the hard task of draining and cultivating the swampy territories around. In this area malaria (swamp fever) took its toll.

Climate 

The climate in Dresano is characterised by sultry summers, and rainy, cold winters. Occasionally, heavy snowfall occurs; in 1995 a particularly heavy snowfall blocked the roads, paralysing traffic and forcing schools to close for several days.

The end of August-early September is characterised by violent thunderstorms and heavy sleet which signal the end of summer.

Topography 

The village is divided into four smaller areas: the old village (Dresano vecchio), Madonnina (built in the 1960s), Villaggio ambrosiano (erected in the 1970s) and Villaggio Helios (begun in the 1990s).

The old village shows one of the oldest farms in the area, Cascina Belpensiero, which displays a centuries-old tree in the middle of the farmyard.  This former dairy farm is already mentioned in written historical sources dating back to 1500, and it is still surrounded by fields,  from the village.

Every year, in May, the traditional "Quater Pass per un Vitel" (= "four steps for a calf" in the local dialect), an amatorial footrace, is organised by the local sports group Gruppo Sportivo Marciatori San Giorgio (San Giorgio being the local patron saint). The prize for such race used to be a live calf (hence the name), nowadays it is an award.

Government 
The following is a list of the local mayors from 1945 onward

Sport

Sport associations in Dresano include:
Gruppo sportivo marciatori San Giorgio (walkers' group)
Auser (providing assistance to the elderly and the disabled)
Dresano Calcio (soccer team)
Dresano Basket (basketball team)

Events 

Carnevale dresanese (carnival): February
Dresano fiorita (flower show): 2nd Sunday of April
"Quater pass per un vitel": 1st Sunday of June (footrace)
Marcia Serale del Belpensiero (footrace): June (non-competitive footrace by night)
Festa dell'uva (grapevine fair): 2nd Sunday of September

The gym and the municipal library, managed by volunteers, are located in the school complex of the Villaggio ambrosiano.

Ecology 

Dresano owns a water purification plant.  The water purifier can be found along the Addetta floodway, close to Balbiano.

Fields in Dresano territory are intensely farmed.  The most popular cultivations are:
wheat
barley
fodder maize
oilseed rape

Biodiversity 

Dresano, a farmland tradition town, has shown in the last few years an increased level of biodiversity, thanks to various animal and  plant species, that live mainly along waterways.

Wildlife 

Local noticeable wild animal species, especially on the Addetta floodway banks, include:
 
Grey heron (Ardea cinerea)
Pheasant
Common chaffinch (Fringilla coelebs)
Moorhen
Little egret (Egretta garzetta)
Mallard (Anas platyrhynchos)
Kingfisher
Common blackbird (Turdus merula)
Green woodpecker (Picus viridis)
Song thrush (Turdus philomelos)
Common nightingale (Luscinia megarhynchos)
European rabbit
European hare
Coypu (nutria)
Bat
European hedgehog
Fox
Bumble bee
Dragonfly
Glow-worm
Mediterranean barbel
Crucian carp
European chub
Pumpkinseed (common sunfish)
Walking catfish
European perch
Common rudd
Tench
Western green lizard
Frog
Toad
Swollen river mussel
a black and red huge crayfish, not yet identified

Flora 
Humulus lupulus, also called wild asparagus, but it is actually a species of the hop plant. It can be added to soups, omelettes, salads, rice, or boiled and dressed with olive oil and lemon.  
Evergreen hawthorn
Roman chamomile
Horsetail
Fig (Ficus)
Black mulberry
Scarlet rose mallow
White horse-chestnut tree
Peppermint (Brandy mint)
Walnut
Hazel
Onice, women's clogs were once made with this wood, since it doesn't warm the feet too much.
Plane tree
White poplar
Black poplar
Aspen
Wild plum tree
Black locust (False acacia)
Blackberry bush (Blackberry bramble)
Elder
Grapevine

References

External links
 Official website

Cities and towns in Lombardy